Anna is a German Christmas television series from 1987, very popular in West Germany then and in the surrounding countries.

See also
List of German television series

External links
 

1987 German television series debuts
1987 German television series endings
ZDF original programming
German children's television series
Television series about ballet
German-language television shows